Ky-Chun So(born 10 June 1958) is a South Korean theologian and is the Kwang Jang Chair Professor of the New Testament, Early Christianity, and the Nag Hammadi Library at Presbyterian University and Theological Seminary in Seoul.  At Claremont School of Theology and the Claremont Graduate University, California, USA, he studied New Testament theology, Nag Hammadi texts and Gospels from James M. Robinson, a disciple of Rudolf Bultmann.

Career 
Since 1989, So has been involved in researching the restoration of the historical Jesus' sayings. He also belongs to the International Q project of the Society of Biblical Literature (SBL). He is the co-editor of the Critical Edition of Q source. He published Jesus in Q: The Sabbath and Theology of the Bible and Extracanonical Texts, a study of the relationship between the Sabbath and the theology of Jesus in 2017. He published the book on Ernst Fuchs and Gerhard Ebelling in 2006.
He is now the head of the Jesus Sayings Hub in Korea, the president of the Society of Korean Q Studies, and the secretary of the Korea Reformed Theological Society . It is the preparation committee for the 500th anniversary of the Reformation.

Publications

Thesis

Books

Journal articles 
 
 
 
 
 
 
 
 
 
 
 
 
 
 
 *

Chapters

References 

1958 births
Living people
21st-century Calvinist and Reformed Christians
South Korean Calvinist and Reformed Christians
South Korean theologians
New Testament scholars